Carla Zaccagnini (born 1973) is a Brazilian artist and curator.

Early life and education
Zaccagnini was born in Buenos Aires in 1973. In 1981 she moved to Brazil with her family. She received a BFA degree from the Fundação Armando Alvares Penteado, São Paulo in 1995. In 2004 Zaccagnini earned an MA in Visual Poetics from the Universidade de São Paulo.

Career
IN 2021 she was a guest curator for the 34th Bienal de São Paulo.
Her work is included in the collection of the Tate Museum, London and the Guggenheim Museum. Her work Elements of Beauty: a Tea Set is Never Only a Tea Set, 2014 - 2015 is held in the collection of the Museu de Arte de Sao Paulo.

References

1973 births
Living people
Artists from Buenos Aires
20th-century Brazilian women artists
21st-century Brazilian women artists
21st-century Brazilian artists
Brazilian contemporary artists